Brekov Castle (Slovak Brekovský hrad, Hungarian Barkó vára) is a ruined Gothic and Renaissance era stone castle above the village of Brekov in Humenné District, Prešov Region, in east Slovakia. It is a hilltop castle located on a cone-shaped hill with a limestone bedrock, in an altitude of approximately 480 m (1574.80 ft) above sea level. The eponymous village at the foot of the castle hill was founded as an adjoined castle settlement, similarly to several other villages in the region. Brekov and Brekov Castle lie in the traditional region of Zemplín. The castle is listed in the National Cultural Heritage list of the Monuments Board of the Slovak Republic.

History

The castle hill saw human settlement and fortification efforts even before the construction of the medieval castle. Recovered evidence from earlier archaeological research on the hill top and its perimeter revealed the existence of a smaller hill fort of local Slavic tribes during the early Middle Ages.

The beginnings of the stone castle date back to the second half of the 13th century.

Conservation works
Though there were occasional small-scale efforts at conserving certain parts of the castle's masonry during the 20th century, Brekov had mostly been untouched by conservation efforts since it became a ruin in the 17th century (much like other ruined or smaller castles in Slovakia). A concerted and systematic effort at new archaeological research and ruin conservation works on the castle was launched only recently, in the second half of the 2000s. The castle is currently administered by the local historical association Združenie na záchranu Brekovského hradu (ZNZBH, "Association for the Salvaging of Brekov Castle"), crewed with professional archaeologists, historians, architects and masonry experts, as well as local and regional volunteers. The administration, research and conservation works of the association are conducted in official cooperation with the Brekov municipality and the regional branch of the Monuments Board of the Slovak Republic. Research and conservation efforts have been ongoing since 2007 and have focused on clearing the castle hill of excess vegetation, archaeological research, masonry conservation of the northern walls and former courtyard gate of the Upper Castle and masonry conservation on the 16th century entrance gate of the Lower Castle.

Gallery

See also
List of castles in Slovakia
Jasenov Castle - A nearby sister castle, part of the historical Humenné Manor of the Drugeth family, along with Brekov Castle.

References

External links

 Historical association Združenie na záchranu Brekovského hradu (in Slovak)

Castles in Slovakia
Ruined castles in Slovakia
Buildings and structures in Prešov Region
Tourist attractions in Prešov Region
13th-century architecture in Slovakia
Gothic architecture in Slovakia
Renaissance architecture in Slovakia